The police force of Albuquerque, New Mexico has been involved in a number of shooting incidents and has used other forms of force, many of these involving the use of SWAT teams. The city's police department was the subject of a Department of Justice Investigation in 2014 which found that the department "engages in a pattern or practice of use of excessive force, including deadly force, in violation of the Fourth Amendment". The report also stated that the department suffered from "structural and systemic deficiencies-including insufficient oversight, inadequate training, and ineffective policies".

Incidents of police shootings

Other use of force incidents

References

+Albuquerque
Albuquerque Police Department
Police brutality in the United States
Law enforcement in New Mexico
Lists of killings by law enforcement officers in the United States
police shootings
History of Albuquerque, New Mexico